Calsonic Arena is an arena in Shelbyville, Tennessee. It is best known as the home of the Tennessee Walking Horse National Celebration, but it hosts a variety of events throughout the year, including motocross competitions, 4-H events, dog shows, rodeos and circuses.

Annual events
Calsonic Arena is host to a number of popular annual events. The Lone Star Rodeo has been held there for 25 years, and includes such traditional rodeo events as bull riding and calf roping, as well as trick riding. The Spotted Saddle Horse World Championship show is held at Calsonic Arena, as is the Great Celebration Mule and Donkey Show.
The most popular annual event held at Calsonic Arena, however, is the Tennessee Walking Horse National Celebration, the largest show for the Tennessee Walking Horse. The Celebration itself encompasses a wide variety of activities besides the horse show, and includes a trade fair and barbecue cookout.

References

Shelbyville, Tennessee
Sports venues in Tennessee